Betsy May Randle (born June 24, 1955) is an American actress known for her role as Amy Matthews on Boy Meets World which lasted seven seasons.

Biography
Born in Chicago, Randle grew up in the suburb of Glenview. She is a graduate of New Trier High School (class of 1968) and the University of Kansas. Randle is married to film editor John Randle and they have two children, Aaron, who is married and has a child born in 2013, and Jessica. Randle and her family reside in Ojai, California.

Filmography
 Family Ties (1989), in 2-part episode: "All in the Neighborhood", as Nancy
 Home Improvement (1992–1993) as Karen Kelly (7 episodes)
 Boy Meets World (1993–2000) as Amy Matthews (main role)
 H-E Double Hockey Sticks (1999) (uncredited)
 Urban Mythology (2000) as Carol Simpson
 The Nightmare Room (2001) as Dylan's mother
 The Beat (2003) as Marie Bernard
 Charmed (2004) as Mrs. Winterbourne (4 episodes)
 Girl Meets World (2014), in 3 episodes as Amy Matthews
 Adam Ruins Everything (2015–2016) as Donna Rehm  (2 episodes)
 Dirty 30 (2016) as Todd's Mom
 Eve of Abduction (2018) as Doreen
 Painter (2020) as Joanne
 To the Beat!: Back 2 School (2020) as Principal Margaret Rogers

References

External links
 

1955 births
Living people
American television actresses
Actresses from Chicago
New Trier High School alumni
People from Glenview, Illinois
University of Kansas alumni
20th-century American actresses
21st-century American actresses